Uwe Ronneburger (23 November 1920 – 1 October 2007) was a German politician from the Free Democratic Party. 

He was from 1980 to 1983 Chairman of the Committee on Intra-German Relations, from May to December 1990 Chairman of the Defence Committee of the German Bundestag. From 1976 to 1982 he was also deputy national chairman of the FDP. He also was a member of the Landtag of Schleswig-Holstein between 1975 and 1980.

References

1920 births
2007 deaths
Politicians from Kiel
Members of the Bundestag for Schleswig-Holstein
Members of the Bundestag 1987–1990
Members of the Bundestag 1983–1987
Members of the Bundestag 1980–1983
Members of the Bundestag 1972–1976
Members of the Landtag of Schleswig-Holstein
Knights Commander of the Order of Merit of the Federal Republic of Germany
Members of the Bundestag for the Free Democratic Party (Germany)